NouvEON (officially NouvEON Technology Partners) is an employee-owned Management consulting and Information Technology Consulting firm. NouvEON offers strategic- and project-based management consulting services. Headquartered in Charlotte, North Carolina, NouvEON also has offices in Raleigh, North Carolina and professional consultants in Philadelphia, Pennsylvania; Baltimore, Maryland; Minneapolis, Minnesota; and Houston, TX.

History
NouvEON was founded in February 2003 in Charlotte, North Carolina by T.J. Eberle and Jeff Hobensack.  

In July 2011, hiSoft acquired NouvEON.

NouvEON began as a local and regional consulting firm offering three broad services: strategic management solutions, e-solutions, and contract and placement solutions. Over the years, NouvEON has refined its business model, resulting in the firm dropping its staff augmentation services.

In 2008, NouvEON opened a second office in Raleigh, North Carolina.

In 2010, NouvEON tripled in size (22 billable consultants to 77) and doubled in revenue ($7M to $14M).

In August 2010, NouvEON acquired InCentric Solutions LLC.

References

Management consulting firms of the United States